Royal Air Force Great Dunmow or more simply RAF Great Dunmow is a former Royal Air Force station in the parish of Little Easton, Essex, England.

Opened in 1943, it was used by both the Royal Air Force and United States Army Air Forces during the war, primarily as a bomber airfield. The airfield was closed in 1948.

Today the airfield is located on private land primarily used for agriculture.

History
Great Dunmow was designed as a Class A airfield bomber airfield, built by the US Army 818th Engineer Battalion (Aviation) with specialised work by British contractors.

The airfield was built on ancient parkland belonging to Easton Lodge and some 10,000 trees were destroyed to enable its construction, including over 200 mature oak trees.  It consisted of a set of three converging runways each containing a concrete runway for takeoffs and landings, optimally placed at 60-degree angles to each other in a triangular pattern.  The runways were a  main runway, aligned 15/33 and two secondary  secondary runways, aligned 11/29 and 04/22.  An encircling perimeter track was also constructed, containing 50 loop-type hardstands.

United States Army Air Forces use
Great Dunmow airfield was opened on 1 July 1943 and was used by the United States Army Air Forces Eighth and Ninth Air Forces. It was known as USAAF Station AAF-164 for security reasons by the USAAF during the war, and by which it was referred to instead of location.  Its USAAF Station Code was "GD".

USAAF Station Units assigned to RAF Great Dunmow were: 
 70th Service Group
 380th Service Squadron; HHS 70th Service Group
 20th Station Complement Squadron 
 21st Weather Squadron
 39th Mobile Reclamation and Repair Squadron
 40th Mobile Communications Squadron
Regular Army Station Units included:
 Quartermaster Depot Q_108
 1577th Quartermaster Battalion
 628th Quartermaster Battalion
 1054th Quartermaster Company
 1087th Signal Company
 1176th Military Police Company
 1769th Ordnance Supply & Maintenance Company
 2057th Quartermaster Truck Company
 2196th Quartermaster Truck Company
 3215th Quartermaster Service Company
 335th Quartermaster Depot Company
 340th Quartermaster Depot Company
 807th Chemical Company
 2045th Engineer Fire Fighting Platoon
 194th Medical Dispensary

386th Bombardment Group (Medium)

The first unit to use Great Dunmow was the American 386th Bombardment Group (Medium) which arrived from RAF Boxted on 24 September 1943. The group was assigned to the VIII Air Support Command 3d Bombardment Wing and flew Martin B-26B/C Marauders. Operational squadrons of the 322d were:
 552d Bombardment Squadron (RG)
 553d Bombardment Squadron (AN)
 554th Bombardment Squadron (RU)
 555th Bombardment Squadron (YA)

Missions of the 386th concentrated on airfields but also bombed marshalling yards and gun positions during the first months of combat.

In common with other Marauder units of the 3d Bomb Division, the 386th was transferred to Ninth Air Force 98th Bombardment Wing on 16 October 1943.

On 2 October 1944, the 386th Bomb Group moved to Beaumont-sur-Oise (A-60) Airfield, in Normandy France.

The following units were here at some point:
 No. 190 Squadron RAF with the Short Stirling IV and the Handley Page Halifax III & VII (1944-46)
 No. 620 Squadron RAF with the Stirling IV and Halifax A VII (1944-46)

The airfield was abandoned in 1948.

Current use

With the end of military control in 1950 the grassed areas were cut for a grass meal company through the 1950s which supplied it to various farms in the region.  Starting in 1960, farming operations commenced and the concrete areas were removed for aggregate in 1965/66 for use as part of the new A12 road.

Today, there is very little left except some single track agricultural roads remaining from the perimeter track and a blister hangar with a few nissen huts near Easton Lodge.   The runway layout and the airfield perimeter track are easily identified in aerial photography, but no substantial amount of concrete remains. The 22 end of the secondary northeast runway does however, have a short full width of runway intact, being used for manure storage. The current owners, Land Securities hope to redevelop the site and surrounding area, including the construction of around 9,000 homes.

There is a small museum in Great Dunmow which holds some exhibits of the airfield and the 386th Bomb Group, along with a stained glass window memorial in Little Easton church.

See also

List of former Royal Air Force stations

References

Citations

Bibliography

 Freeman, Roger A. (1978) Airfields of the Eighth: Then and Now. After the Battle 
 Freeman, Roger A. (1991) The Mighty Eighth: The Colour Record. Cassell & Co. 
 Freeman, Roger A. (1994) UK Airfields of the Ninth: Then and Now 1994. After the Battle 
 Freeman, Roger A. (1996) The Ninth Air Force in Colour: UK and the Continent-World War Two. After the Battle 

 Maurer, Maurer (1983). Air Force Combat Units of World War II. Maxwell AFB, Alabama: Office of Air Force History. .
 mighty8thaf.preller.us Great Dunmow
 USAAS-USAAC-USAAF-USAF Aircraft Serial Numbers--1908 to present
 British Automobile Association (AA), (1978), Complete Atlas of Britain,

External links

  Great Dunmow photo gallery

Royal Air Force stations in Essex
Royal Air Force stations of World War II in the United Kingdom
Airfields of the VIII Bomber Command in the United Kingdom
Airfields of the 9th Bombardment Division in the United Kingdom
1943 establishments in England
1948 disestablishments in England